Merijn Scheperkamp (born 6 March 2000) is a Dutch speed skater who specializes in the sprint distances.

Career
Scheperkamp won the bronze medal at inline skating at the 2018 Youth Olympic Games in Buenos Aires. He made his ISU Speed Skating World Cup debut in October 2021 at the Ice Arena Tomaszów Mazowiecki in Poland where he finished ninth in the first heat.

He qualified for the 500m at the 2022 Winter Olympics by winning the Dutch Olympic qualifying event.

Scheperkamp is part of the junior team of Team Jumbo-Visma.

Personal records

Tournament overview

source:

Medals won

References

External links

2000 births
Living people
Dutch male speed skaters
Sportspeople from Hilversum
Speed skaters at the 2022 Winter Olympics
Olympic speed skaters of the Netherlands
World Sprint Speed Skating Championships medalists
21st-century Dutch people